Rodiontsevo is a rural locality (a village) in Spasskoye Rural Settlement, Vologodsky District, Vologda Oblast, Russia. The population was 14 as of 2002. There are 48 streets.

Geography 
Rodiontsevo is located 6 km southwest of Vologda (the district's administrative centre) by road. Burtsevo is the nearest rural locality.

References 

Rural localities in Vologodsky District